Elio De Anna (born September 30, 1949 in Cordenons) is an Italian former rugby union player turned politician.

As rugby player, De Anna twice won the Italian title with Rugby Rovigo, where he played alongside his brother Dino. He received 27 caps for the Italian team from 1972 to 1980.

He graduated in medicine. He served as President of the Province of Pordenone with Forza Italia from 1999 to 2008.

After retiring as a player he practiced as a doctor, first in Rovigo then Cordenons, among the leadership positions held, including that of director of the Italian Athletics Federation.

Notes

1949 births
Living people
People from the Province of Pordenone
Italian rugby union players
Rugby union wings
Italy international rugby union players
Rugby Rovigo Delta players
Forza Italia politicians
Presidents of the Province of Pordenone
Sportspeople from Friuli-Venezia Giulia